Patricia Obregón (born 30 September 1950) is a Mexican former butterfly swimmer. She competed in two events at the 1968 Summer Olympics.

References

External links
 

1950 births
Living people
Mexican female butterfly swimmers
Olympic swimmers of Mexico
Swimmers at the 1968 Summer Olympics
People from Matamoros, Tamaulipas
Sportspeople from Tamaulipas